Albert E. Smith was a member of the Wisconsin State Assembly.

Biography
Smith was born in Cape Vincent, New York in October 1839. Soon after, he moved with his parents to Wisconsin, settling in Walworth County, Wisconsin. During the American Civil War, he served with the 8th Wisconsin Volunteer Infantry Regiment of the Union Army, achieving the rank of captain.

Political career
Smith was elected to the Assembly in 1900 and was re-elected in 1902. Additionally, he served as Mayor of Delavan, Wisconsin. He was a Republican.

References

See also
The Political Graveyard

People from Cape Vincent, New York
People from Delavan, Wisconsin
Republican Party members of the Wisconsin State Assembly
Mayors of places in Wisconsin
People of Wisconsin in the American Civil War
Union Army officers
1839 births
20th-century deaths
Year of death missing